RMP may refer to:

 Radio Motor Patrol, a police car equipped with a radio
 Rajshahi Metropolitan Police, the police force in Rajshahi, Bangladesh
 RMP, IATA code for Rampart Airport, Alaska 
 Random match possibility, a measure used in population genetics
 RateMyProfessors.com, a website for student ratings of college instructors
 "Reprogrammable microprocessor", variant of the FIM-92 Stinger anti-aircraft missile
 Resonant magnetic perturbations, a plasma physics technique used in tokamak fusion reactors
 Resting membrane potential, electrical potential across a cell membrane
 Reviews of Modern Physics, a journal published by the American Physical Society
 Revolutionary Marxist Party, a political party in India (Kerala)
 Rhind Mathematical Papyrus, an ancient Egyptian manuscript
 Rifampicin, an antibiotic
 Risk management plan, an element of project management 
 Royal Malaysian Police, Malaysian police force
 Royal Marine Police, a former British civil police force which guarded Admiralty establishments
 Royal Military Police, British army police
 Royal Melbourne Philharmonic, an Australian choir and orchestra
 Russian Maoist Party, a Russian political party founded in 2000

See also